Cedar Valley is an unincorporated community in Bell County, in the U.S. state of Texas. According to the Handbook of Texas, only 4 people lived in the community in 2000. It is located within the Killeen-Temple-Fort Hood metropolitan area.

History
Cedar Valley had several churches. It had only two churches, several scattered homes, and an air strip in 1990 and had a population of only 4 through 2000.

Geography

Education
In 1903, Cedar Valley had a school that served 44 students and remained in operation in 1948. Today, the community is served by the Salado Independent School District.

References

Unincorporated communities in Texas
Unincorporated communities in Bell County, Texas